Gilles Fabien (born September 27, 1978 in Cayenne) is a French Guianan footballer, who is currently playing for Angoulême CFC in Division Honneur (6th division).

International career

International goals
Scores and results list French Guiana's goal tally first.

References

External links
Gilles Fabien profile at foot-national.com

1978 births
Living people
Sportspeople from Cayenne
French Guiana international footballers
French Guianan footballers
Association football forwards
Ligue 2 players
Championnat National players
Le Mans FC players
Tours FC players
Angoulême Charente FC players
Louhans-Cuiseaux FC players
Stade Lavallois players
AS Beauvais Oise players
SO Romorantin players
2014 Caribbean Cup players
ESA Brive players
Bergerac Périgord FC players